The women's 50 metre rifle three positions competition at the 2014 Asian Games in Incheon, South Korea was held on 26 September at the Ongnyeon International Shooting Range.

Schedule
All times are Korea Standard Time (UTC+09:00)

Records

Results
Legend
DNS — Did not start

Qualification

Final

References

ISSF Results Overview

External links
Official website

Women Rifle 50 3P